Events from the year 1317 in Ireland.

Incumbent
 Lord: Edward II

Events
 Ballymote Castle was captured by the O'Connors of Sligo
 Alexander de Bicknor becomes Archbishop of Dublin

 
1310s in Ireland
Ireland
Years of the 14th century in Ireland